Greg "Bluey" Mackey (20 October 1961 – 24 September 2014) was an Australian professional rugby league footballer who played in the 1980s and 1990s.

Playing career
Mackey played  in Warrington's 24–16 victory over Oldham in the 1989 Lancashire Cup Final during the 1989–90 season at Knowsley Road, St. Helens on Saturday 14 October 1989.

Mackey played  in Warrington's 10–40 defeat by Wigan in the 1994–95 Regal Trophy Final during the 1994–95 season at Alfred McAlpine Stadium, Huddersfield on Saturday 28 January 1995.

Mackey played , was captain, and was man of the match, winning the Harry Sunderland Trophy in Hull FC's 14–4 victory over Widnes in the Premiership Final during the 1990–91 season at Old Trafford, Manchester on Sunday 12 May 1991.

Mackey played in Warrington's 0–24 defeat by Australia on the 1994 Kangaroo tour of Great Britain and France at Wilderspool Stadium, Warrington on Wednesday 9 November 1994.

Mackey died on 24 September 2014, 26 days short of his 53rd birthday. He had been battling cancer.

References

External links
Statistics at thebulldogs.com.au
 (archived by web.archive.org) Stats → PastPlayers → M at hullfc.com
 (archived by web.archive.org) Statistics at hullfc.com
'Rusty Steelers' reunite

1961 births
2014 deaths
Australian rugby league players
Canterbury-Bankstown Bulldogs players
Huddersfield Giants players
Hull F.C. players
Illawarra Steelers players
Deaths from cancer in New South Wales
Rugby league fullbacks
Rugby league wingers
Rugby league centres
Rugby league five-eighths
Rugby league halfbacks
Rugby league locks
South Sydney Rabbitohs players
Rugby league players from Sydney
Warrington Wolves players
Widnes Vikings players